An election to Worcestershire County Council took place on 2 May 2013 as part of the 2013 United Kingdom local elections. 57 councillors were elected from 53 electoral divisions, which returned either one or two county councillors each by first-past-the-post voting for a four-year term of office. The divisions were the same as those used at the previous election in 2009. The election saw the Conservative Party retain overall control of the council with a significantly reduced majority of just 2 seats.

All locally registered electors (British, Commonwealth and European Union citizens) who were aged 18 or over on Thursday 2 May 2013 were entitled to vote in the local elections. Those who were temporarily away from their ordinary address (for example, away working, on holiday, in student accommodation or in hospital) were also entitled to vote in the local elections, although those who had moved abroad and registered as overseas electors cannot vote in the local elections. It is possible to register to vote at more than one address (such as a university student who had a term-time address and lives at home during holidays) at the discretion of the local Electoral Register Office, but it remains an offence to vote more than once in the same local government election.

Summary
The Conservative Party retained control of the council with a majority of two seats. The Labour Party, who had in 2009 won a total of 3 seats, became the official opposition with a total of 12 seats.

UKIP became the third largest party, gaining 4 seats. The Liberal Democrats, who formed the official opposition prior to the election, won three seats, a net loss of five.

The Independent Kidderminster Hospital and Health Concern and the Green Party both won two seats, while the Wythall Residents Association and continuation Liberal Party won one seat each.

Results

Results by electoral division

Bromsgrove

Malvern Hills

Redditch Borough

Worcester City

Wychavon

Wyre Forest

References

2013
2013 English local elections
2010s in Worcestershire